The Radeon 400 series is a series of graphics processors developed by AMD. These cards were the first to feature the Polari GPUs, using the new 14 nm FinFET manufacturing process, developed by Samsung Electronics and licensed to GlobalFoundries. The Polaris family initially included two new chips in the Graphics Core Next (GCN) family (Polaris 11 and Polaris 12). Polaris implements the 4th generation of the Graphics Core Next instruction set, and shares commonalities with the previous GCN microarchitectures.

Naming 

The RX prefix is used for cards that offer over 1.5 teraflops of performance and 80 GB/s of memory throughput (with memory compression), and achieve at least 60 FPS at 1080p in popular games such as Dota 2 and League of Legends. Otherwise, it will be omitted. Like previous generations, the first numeral in the number refers to the generation (4 in this case) and the second numeral in the number refers to the tier of the card, of which there are six. Tier 4, the weakest tier in the 400 series, will lack the RX prefix and feature a 64-bit memory bus. Tiers 5 and 6 will have both RX prefixed and non-RX prefixed cards, indicating that while they will both feature a 128-bit memory bus and be targeted at 1080p gaming, the latter will fall short 1.5 teraflops of performance. Tiers 7 and 8 will each have a 256-bit memory bus and will be marketed as 1440p cards. The highest tier, tier 9, will feature a memory bus greater than 256-bit and shall be aimed at 4K gaming. Finally, the third numeral will indicate whether the card is in its first or second revision with either a 0 or 5, respectively. Therefore, for example, the RX 460 indicates that it has at least 1.5 teraflops of performance, 100 GB/s of memory throughput, has a 128-bit memory bus and will be able to achieve 60 FPS in the previously mentioned games at 1080p.

OpenCL (API) 

OpenCL allows use of GPUs for highly parallel numeric computation accelerates many scientific software packages against CPU up to factor 10 or 100 and more.
OpenCL 1.0 to 1.2 are supported for all chips with Terascale or GCN architectures. OpenCL 2.0 is supported with GCN 2nd gen. or higher. Any OpenCL 2.0 conformant card can gain OpenCL 2.1 and 2.2 support with only a driver update.

Vulkan (API) 

API Vulkan 1.0 is supported for all GCN architecture cards. Vulkan 1.2 requires GCN 2nd gen or higher with the Adrenalin 20.1 and Linux Mesa 20.0 drivers and newer.

New features 
This series is based on the fourth generation GCN architecture. It includes new hardware schedulers, a new primitive discard accelerator, a new display controller, and an updated UVD that can decode HEVC at 4K resolutions at 60 frames per second with 10 bits per color channel. On 8 December 2016, AMD released Crimson ReLive drivers (Version 16.12.1), which make GCN-GPUs support VP9 decode acceleration up to 4K@60 Hz and twinned with support for Dolby Vision and HDR10.

Chips

Polaris
Polaris 10 features 2304 stream processors across 36 Compute Units (CUs), and supports up to 8GB of GDDR5 memory on a 256-bit memory interface. The GPU replaces the mid-range Tonga segment of the Radeon M300 line. According to AMD, their prime target with the design of Polaris was energy efficiency: Polaris 10 was initially planned to be a mid-range chip, to be featured in the RX 480, with a TDP of around 110-135W compared to its predecessor R9 380's 190W TDP. Despite this, the Polaris 10 chip is anticipated to run the latest DirectX 12 games "at a resolution of 1440p with a stable 60 frames per second."

Polaris 11, on the other hand, is to succeed the "Curacao" GPU which powers various low-to-mid-range cards. It features 1024 stream processors over 16 CUs, coupled with up to 4GB of GDDR5 memory on a 128 bit memory interface. Polaris 11 has a TDP of 75W.

Reviews 

Many reviewers praised the performance of the RX 480 8GB when evaluated in light of its $239 release price. The Tech Report stated that the RX 480 is the fastest card for the $200 segment at the time of its launch. HardOCP gave this card an Editor's Choice Silver award. PC Perspective gave it the PC Perspective Gold Award.

RX 480 reference card PCI Express power limit violations 

Some reviewers discovered that the AMD Radeon RX 480 violates the PCI Express power draw specifications, which allows a maximum of 75 watts (66w 12v) being drawn from the motherboard's PCI Express slot. Chris Angelini of Tom's Hardware noticed that in a stress test it can draw up to an average of 90 watts from the slot and 86 watts in a typical gaming load. The peak usage can be up to 162 watts and 300 watts altogether with the power supply in a gaming load. TechPowerUp corroborated these results by noting it can also draw up to 166 watts from the power supply, past the limit of 75 watts for a 6-pin PCI Express power connector. Ryan Shrout of PC Perspective did a follow-up test after other reports and found out his review sample takes 80-84 watts from the motherboard at stock speed, and that the other PCI Express slots' 12 volt power supply pins were supplying only 11.5 volts during load on his Asus ROG Rampage V Extreme motherboard. He was not concerned about the voltage droop due to the specification's 8% voltage tolerance, but did note of possible problems in systems where multiple overclocked RX 480 cards are running in quad CrossFire, or in motherboards that are not designed to withstand high currents, such as budget and older models.

AMD has released a driver that reprograms the voltage regulator module to draw less power from the motherboard, allowing the power draw from the motherboard to pass the PCI Express specification. While this worsens the overage on the 6-pin power connector, that violation is not much of a concern because these connectors have a greater safety margin in their power rating. The amount of power drawn from on the connector is dependent on a newly introduced "compatibility mode" in the driver. When on, compatibility mode reduces the total power consumption of the card, allowing both power sources to operate closer to their ratings. Standard mode yields essentially unchanged performance, while compatibility mode results in performance drops within the error of benchmarks. Some RX 480 cards designed by AMD's partners include an 8-pin power connector which can provide more power than the stock design.

Chipset table

 Supported display standards are: DisplayPort 1.4 HBR, HDMI 2.0b, HDR10 color 
 Dual-Link DVI-D and DVI-I at resolutions up to 4096×2304 are also supported, despite ports not being present on the reference cards.

Desktop

Mobile

Radeon Feature Matrix

See also 
 AMD Radeon Pro
 AMD FirePro
 AMD FireMV
 AMD FireStream
 AMD Vega
 List of AMD graphics processing units

References

AMD graphics cards
Computer-related introductions in 2016
Graphics processing units
Graphics cards